Qiaocheng District, formerly named Bo County (亳县), anciently named Qiao County (谯县), is a district of the city of Bozhou, Anhui Province, China.

Administrative divisions
In the present, Qiaocheng District has 3 subdistricts, 18 towns and 2 townships.
3 subdistricts
 Tangling
 Huaxilou
 Xuege

18 towns

2 townships
 Zhangdian
 Zhaoqiao

References

Bozhou